The Southern Amateur League (SAL) is an association football league in England affiliated to the Amateur Football Alliance (AFA). It is based in and around Greater London and caters for 11–a–side men's adult teams. A feature of the league is 'multi-team football', common in AFA leagues, with clubs fielding an average of 4-5 teams each. For season 2021–22 the league has 40 open aged member clubs and a handful of veterans-only clubs running around 190 teams in 21 divisions. All clubs are strictly amateur.

Club set-up, sportsmanship and hospitality
As in other AFA leagues it is common for clubs to run several teams with some SAL clubs running up to 10 teams. This allows players of all abilities to play against teams from other clubs of a similar standard. The best players will be picked for the 1st team, the best of the remainder going into the 2nd team and so on down the club.

The SAL places emphasis on sportsmanship and hospitality, with all players expected to socialise with their opponents and the match officials after the game. Disciplinary problems and cases of violent conduct are generally perceived to be experienced less in SAL football – and AFA football in general – than in other types of football.

League set-up and Challenge Cups
The League is divided into four sections: Senior (restricted to 1st teams, 3 divisions), Intermediate (4 divisions), Junior North (5 divisions) and Junior South (6 divisions). Teams can be promoted between the Intermediate and Junior Sections but 1st teams wishing to move up to the Senior Section must do by application the League Management Committee (only 1st teams may play in the Senior Section).

In 2018 a Veterans Section was added, divided into north and south sections for league competitions. Clubs do not have to enter the open-age competitions in order to enter the veterans competition and do not have to play in the veterans league competition in order to enter the cup and shield competitions.

As well as league competitions the SAL runs ten cup competitions. These are:

Senior Cup (for teams in Senior Divisions 1, 2 and 3 as well as additional teams by invitation)
Intermediate Cup (for teams in Intermediate Divisions 1, 2 and 3)
Junior Cup (for teams in Intermediate Division 4, Junior Divisions 1 North and 1 South)
Minor Cup (Junior Division 2 North and Junior Division 2 South)
Senior Novets Cup (Junior Division 3 North and Junior Division 3 South)
Intermediate Novets Cup (Junior Division 4 South and Junior Division 5 South)
Junior Novets Cup (Junior Division 4 North and Junior Division 6 South)
Veterans Sunday Senior Cup (straight knockout, open entries)
Veterans Sunday Junior Cup (straight knockout, open entries)
Veterans Saturday Shield (group stage and knock-out, open entries)

The Junior Cup and below were inaugurated for the 1995–96. The Senior and Intermediate Cups were introduced for season 2015–16. They were not previously considered necessary as 1st and 2nd teams were offered an extra 'county divisional' cup by the AFA (either the Middlesex/Essex Cup or the Surrey/Kent Cup, depending on location). The veterans competitions began in 2018.

Current member clubs
Three of the current members (Alleyn Old Boys, Civil Service and Crouch End Vampires) are founder members of the League while 19 have been in membership since before World War II.

Representative team
The League representative team has played a programme of friendly fixtures since 1907 against other AFA affiliated leagues and universities such as Oxford and Cambridge. Two matches are played each season in memory of past servants to the League. The Champion Club plays against the Senior Cup winners at the beginning of each season for the Stuart Hyde Trophy, named for the former SAL and Southgate Olympic team manager. The League also plays the Amateur Football Combination for the Steve Langley Cup in honour of the former SAL, AFA and Crouch End Vampires captain. This match is part of the Argonaut Trophy competition which also involves the Arthurian League in which the three league representative teams play a round-robin tournament. Since 2007 the team has played in the FA Inter-League Cup which it won at the first attempt in 2008. This earned the team the chance to represent England at the 2008 UEFA Regions Cup.

League champions and Cup winners

 Between 1936 and 1948 (not including the years of World War II and the transitional season of 1945–46) the league operated two Second Divisions divided apparently at random (certainly not geographically) and no Third Division.

(†) indicates team also won SAL Senior Cup
(a) indicates team also won AFA Senior Cup
(e) indicates team also won AFA Essex Senior Cup
(m) indicates team also won AFA Middlesex Senior Cup
(s) indicates team also won AFA Surrey Senior Cup
(me) indicates team also won AFA Middlesex/Essex Senior Cup
(sk) indicates team also won AFA Surrey/Kent Senior Cup
(o) indicates team also won Old Boys Senior Cup

Further reading

Sources
Southern Amateur League

 
Football leagues in England
Sports leagues established in 1907
1907 establishments in England
Amateur sport in the United Kingdom
Amateur association football